Egypt Lake-Leto is a census-designated place in an unincorporated part of Hillsborough County, Florida, United States. The population was 35,282 at the 2010 census. The area is located just north of Tampa International Airport. The ZIP code for Egypt Lake-Leto is 33614.

Geography

The Egypt Lake-Leto CDP contains the communities of Egypt Lake, Leto, and West Park Estates.

Demographics

As of the census of 2010, there were 35,282 people, 13,800 households, and 8,612 families residing in the census area. The racial makeup of the community was 26.7% White (non-Hispanic), 12.2% African American, 0.2% Native American, 4.2% Asian, 0.05% Pacific Islander, 8.2% from other races, and 3.4% from two or more races. Hispanic or Latino of any race were 60.0% of the population.

There were 13,511 households, out of which 28.8% had children under the age of 18 living with them, 40.1% were married couples living together, 14.8% had a female householder with no husband present, and 40.0% were non-families. 30.4% of all households were made up of individuals, and 5.5% had someone living alone who was 65 years of age or older.  The average household size was 2.42 and the average family size was 3.06.

In the census area, the population was spread out, with 23.1% under the age of 18, 11.3% from 18 to 24, 34.8% from 25 to 44, 20.6% from 45 to 64, and 10.2% who were 65 years of age or older.  The median age was 33 years. For every 100 females, there were 95.2 males.  For every 100 females age 18 and over, there were 92.0 males.

The median income for a household in the census area was $38,189, and the median income for a family was $40,787. Males had a median income of $30,875 versus $27,186 for females. The per capita income for the community was $18,196.  About 17.0% of families and 21.1% of the population were below the poverty line, including 29.2% of those under age 18 and 18.2% of those age 65 or over.

Schools
The area of Egypt Lake-Leto is served by Hillsborough County Schools through Crestwood Elementary School, Egypt Lake Elementary School, Twin Lakes Elementary School, Pierce Middle School, Leto High School, Alonso High School, and Chamberlain High School.

References

Census-designated places in Hillsborough County, Florida
Census-designated places in Florida